Assara tuberculosa is a species of snout moth in the genus Assara. It was described by Edward Meyrick in 1933 and is known from Myanmar.

References

Phycitini
Moths described in 1933
Moths of Asia